Scolopocryptops sexspinosus, the eastern red centipede, is a species of centipede in the family Scolopocryptopidae. It is found in North America. It is the only Scolopendromorph definitively found in Canada. Canadian specimens appear to be most abundant in British Columbia and Vancouver Island.  It is widespread across Eastern North America- from far Southern Canada to Carolina and the Gulf Coast, and prefers hiding under rotting wood or leaf litter (see picture); it is thus difficult to find.

Morphology and Diet 

The Eastern Red Centipede has 23 pairs of legs, and is reddish-orange, although south-eastern individuals are browner. This species of centipedes does not have ocelli, and is thus blind. Grooves on the dorsal plates are incomplete, according to field work, and the first antenna segment (an antennomere) is less hirsute (hairy) than the second or more distant segments. In Virginia, specimens can attain a length of 6.5 cm. This centipede can deliver a painful bite if handled; they feed on spiders, insects, earthworms, and even smaller centipedes. Adults are active throughout the year. The Eastern Red Centipede is capable of thermoregulating and maintaining performance across a broad range of temperatures.

References

External links

 

Scolopendromorpha
Arthropods of North America
Animals described in 1821